Gerhard Ludwig Closs (May 1, 1928 – May 24, 1992) was an American chemist specializing in physical organic chemistry, member of the National Academy of Sciences and the American Academy of Arts and Sciences, chairman of the chemistry department at the University of Chicago.

Closs made seminal contributions in research of  the magnetic properties of the intermediate compounds formed in chemical reactions.
He is also credited with the discovery that certain reactions polarize atomic nuclei.
The National Academies Press called him "one of the outstanding chemists of the post-World War II era".
He was also an early leader in the field of carbene chemistry.
The New York Times called him "pioneering chemist".

Awards and Distinctions 
 Jean Servas Stas Medal by the Belgian Chemical Society in 1971
 James Flack Norris award by the American Chemical Society in 1974
 Arthur C. Cope Award by the American Chemical Society in 1991
 Photochemistry Prize by the Inter-American Photochemical Association in 1992
 elected to the National Academy of Sciences in 1974
 elected to the American Academy of Arts and Sciences in 1975
 The Inter-American Photochemical Association honors his memory with the G. L. Closs Memorial Award

References 

1928 births
1992 deaths
20th-century American chemists
Members of the United States National Academy of Sciences